Facundo Albin (born 27 October 1992) is an Argentine speedway rider who was Argentinian Champion in 2018.

Career
Albin was born in Daireaux, Buenos Aires Province in 1992. He took up speedway at the age of eight, initially riding 50cc bikes, and going on to become a junior champion in the 200cc class.

After moving up to the senior levels, he won a round in the Argentine championship in 2011.

He competed in the World Under-21 Championship in 2012, getting a wildcard to compete in the two rounds held in Argentina, and finishing in 21st place overall. Due to his commitments riding in Europe he missed the first four of nine rounds of the Argentine championship in 2012, but still finished in fifth place overall.

In 2012 he moved to Berwick, England in an attempt to further his career in Europe, and signed a pre-contract agreement with Berwick Bandits, although he didn't get a place in their 2013 team and was released from the contract.

In December 2012 he signed to ride for Sheffield Tigers in the 2013 British Premier League season.

In 2018, he won the Argentine Championship.

References

1992 births
Living people
Argentine speedway riders
Sportspeople from Buenos Aires Province
Sheffield Tigers riders